Khoytobeye (Khoito Beye) is a rural locality (an ulus) in Ivolginsky District, Republic of Buryatia, Russia. The population was 2,754 as of 2010. There are 85 streets.

Geography 
Khoytobeye is located 14 km southwest of Ivolginsk (the district's administrative centre) by road. Verkhnyaya Ivolga is the nearest rural locality.

References 

Rural localities in Ivolginsky District